"In and Out of Love" is a collaboration between Dutch DJ and record producer Armin van Buuren and Dutch singer and songwriter Sharon den Adel from the band Within Temptation. It was released on 6 August 2008 as the second single from van Buuren's third studio album, Imagine.

The single has been performed live by Sharon and Armin during the Armin Only: Imagine shows. As of December 2019, the single has more than 223 million views for its official music video on YouTube, making it the second most viewed video on Armada Music's YouTube channel.

In January 2016, the song was sampled on British rapper Dave's single, "JKYL+HYD".

In 2019, the song was covered by Visions of Atlantis on the album, Wanderers.

Track listing

Netherlands digital download

Netherlands / Belgium CD single

Netherlands 12"

Netherlands 12"

2009 US / France digital download and CD single

2010 UK CD single

2010 UK remixes

2010 Netherlands digital download remixes

2011 Iran digital download T&T remix

2014 Russia digital download Aimoon & Ma2shek bootlegs

2015 Netherlands digital download Lost Frequencies radio edit

2015 Netherlands digital download Lost Frequencies remix

2015 Netherlands digital download Lost Frequencies remixes

2015 Italy digital download Mr Dendo bootleg

2016 Netherlands digital download Diversion remix

Charts

Weekly charts

Year-end charts

References 

2008 singles
2008 songs
Armin van Buuren songs
Songs written by Armin van Buuren
Songs written by Sharon den Adel
Songs written by Benno de Goeij